Douglas (2001 population: 2,369) is a Canadian suburban community in York County, New Brunswick.

Located on the east bank of the Saint John River, Douglas developed as a farming community but has witnessed two residential subdivisions developed in recent decades, largely for residents commuting to Fredericton.

History

Notable people

Canadian writer and Confederation Poet Sir Charles G.D. Roberts, who has been called the "father of Canadian literature," was born in Douglas on January 10, 1860.

See also

List of communities in New Brunswick

References

Communities in York County, New Brunswick

fr:Paroisse de Douglas